Pete Close (28 August 1937 – 14 March 1990) was an American middle-distance runner who competed in the 1960 Summer Olympics.

References

External links
 

1937 births
1990 deaths
American male middle-distance runners
Olympic track and field athletes of the United States
Athletes (track and field) at the 1960 Summer Olympics